Derrick's theorem is an argument by physicist G. H. Derrick
which shows that stationary localized solutions to a nonlinear wave equation
or nonlinear Klein–Gordon equation
in spatial dimensions three and higher are unstable.

Original argument
Derrick's paper,
which was considered an obstacle to
interpreting soliton-like solutions as particles,
contained the following physical argument
about non-existence of stable localized stationary solutions
to the nonlinear wave equation

now known under the name of Derrick's Theorem.

The energy of the time-independent solution  is given by

Define  where  is an arbitrary constant, and write , . Then 

Whence 
and since ,

That is,  for a variation corresponding to
a uniform stretching of the particle.
Hence the solution  is unstable.

Pokhozhaev's identity

More generally,
Denote .
Let

be a solution to the equation
,
in the sense of distributions. 
Then  satisfies the relation

known as Pokhozhaev's identity (sometimes spelled as Pohozaev's identity).
This result is similar to the virial theorem.

Interpretation in the Hamiltonian form

We may write the equation

in the Hamiltonian form
,
,
the Hamilton function is given by

are the

Then the stationary solution 
has the energy

and 
satisfies the equation

with
 denoting a variational derivative
of the functional
.
Although the solution 
Derrick's argument shows that

hence

is not a point of the local minimum of the energy functional .
Therefore, physically, the solution  is expected to be unstable.
A related result, showing non-minimization of the energy of localized stationary states

Relation to linear instability
A stronger statement, linear (or exponential) instability of localized stationary solutions
to the nonlinear wave equation (in any spatial dimension) is proved
by P. Karageorgis and W. A. Strauss in 2007.

Stability of localized time-periodic solutions
Derrick describes some possible ways out of this difficulty, including the conjecture that Elementary particles might correspond to stable, localized solutions which are periodic in time, rather than time-independent.
Indeed, it was later shown that a time-periodic solitary wave  with frequency  may be orbitally stable if the Vakhitov–Kolokolov stability criterion is satisfied.

See also
 Orbital stability
 Pokhozhaev's identity
 Vakhitov–Kolokolov stability criterion
 Virial theorem

References

Stability theory
Solitons